Piletocera flavidiscalis is a moth in the family Crambidae. It was described by George Hampson in 1917. It is found in Sikkim, India.

References

flavidiscalis
Moths described in 1917
Taxa named by George Hampson
Moths of Asia